Events in the year 2013 in Angola. The country had a population of 19,183,590.

Incumbents
 President: José Eduardo dos Santos 
 Vice President: Manuel Vicente
 President of the National Assembly: Fernando da Piedade Dias dos Santos

Sports
 19 July to 4 August - The country competed at the 2013 World Aquatics Championships
 10–18 August - The country competed at the 2013 World Championships in Athletics
 20–28 September - The country hosted the 2013 FIRS Men's Roller Hockey World Cup, in Luanda and Namibe (now Moçâmedes)
 15 November - Start of the 2013–14 BAI Basket season
 16–23 November - Inaugural edition of the Angola Second Division Basketball Championship, won by Sporting Clube de Benguela

References

 
2010s in Angola
Years of the 21st century in Angola